Corlu (also, Dzhorlu and Dzhorly) is a village in the Qabala Rayon of Azerbaijan.  The village forms part of the municipality of Mirzəbəyli.

Populated places in Qabala District